Anthony Dion Denham Jr. (born July 21, 1991) is a former American football tight end. He was signed by the Houston Texans as an undrafted free agent in 2014. He played college football at Utah.

Early years
Denham is the son of Anthony Denham Sr. and Dana Lewis. He spent his high school years in foster care. At Woodrow Wilson high school in Los Angeles, California, he had four letters in football, two in basketball and one in track. He was the team's leading receiver and team captain in three years.

College career
In his freshman year, at East Los Angeles College, he set school records for receiving yards and touchdowns with 1,186 yds and 16 touchdowns. In his sophomore 2010 season, his play got caught in a downward spiral, though he still finished second in the American Mountain Conference with 40 catches for 475 yds and 7 touchdowns. Even after his decline, he was still rated as a four star recruit by scout.com and rivals.com. After the 2010 season, he transferred to Utah. In 2011, he redshirted, and in 2012 his play was limited, finishing with 11 catches for 135 yds. In 2013, his senior year, he started 10 games and had 24 catches for 291 yds and two touchdowns.

College football statistics

Professional career

Pre-draft

Houston Texans
Denham went undrafted in the 2014 NFL Draft. He was signed by the Houston Texans, and called up from their practice squad on December 3, 2014. On September 3, 2016, he was released by the Texans.

Philadelphia Eagles
On October 13, 2016, Denham was signed to the Eagles' practice squad. He was released on December 2, 2016 but was re-signed on December 13. He signed a reserve/future contract on January 2, 2017.

On September 1, 2017, Denham was waived by the Eagles.

Arizona Cardinals
On September 26, 2017, Denham was signed to the Arizona Cardinals' practice squad.

Philadelphia Eagles (second stint)
On August 28, 2018, Denham was signed by the Philadelphia Eagles. He was waived on September 1, 2018.

Salt Lake Stallions
In 2019, Denham joined the Salt Lake Stallions of the Alliance of American Football. The league ceased operations in April 2019.

References

1991 births
Living people
American football tight ends
Sportspeople from Monterey, California
Players of American football from California
East Los Angeles Huskies football players
Utah Utes football players
Houston Texans players
Philadelphia Eagles players
Arizona Cardinals players
Salt Lake Stallions players
Woodrow Wilson High School (Los Angeles) alumni